Gao Yun (390–487), courtesy name Bogong (伯恭), formally Duke Wen of Xianyang (咸陽文公), was an official during the reigns of five emperors of the Xianbei-led Northern Wei dynasty of China.

During Emperor Taiwu and Tuoba Yu's regency
Gao Yun was born in 390, while his home commandery of Bohai (勃海, roughly modern Cangzhou, Hebei) was under Later Yan rule, and his father Gao Tao (高韜) served as a low-level official in the administration of Later Yan's founding emperor Murong Chui.  After Northern Wei's Emperor Daowu seized most of Later Yan territory in 397, he commissioned Gao Tao as an official, but Gao Tao soon died.  Gao Yun took the caskets of his grandfather Gao Tai (高泰) and his father Gao Tao back to Bohai Commandery and, after giving his inheritance to his two younger brothers, briefly became a Buddhist monk with the name Fajing (法淨), but soon thereafter gave up the monastical lifestyle.  He studied astronomy and astrology, as well as the Spring and Autumn Annals.  He served as a commandery official as well.

In 430, when he was already 40, Gao Yun served on the staff of Emperor Taiwu's uncle Dugu Hunchao (獨孤渾超) the Prince of Yangping, and he became known for his honesty in judging criminal matters.  In 431, he was summoned to the capital Pingcheng (平城, in modern Datong, Shanxi), and he then served successively on the staffs of Emperor Taiwu's brothers Tuoba Fan (拓拔範) the Prince of Le'an and Tuoba Pi (拓拔丕) the Prince of Leping.  It was after assisting Tuoba Pi in a campaign that he was created the Baron of Wenyang.  Around 440, the powerful prime minister Cui Hao added Gao to his staff, as he began to compile a history of the Northern Wei state.  It was also around this time that he had a debate about astrology with Cui, and while Cui, himself an astrology scholar, initially disagreed with Gao's opinions, he eventually came to accept Gao's opinions.

What Cui did not accept Gao's opinions on was how Cui was approaching his relationship with Emperor Taiwu's crown prince Tuoba Huang, as Cui, against Crown Prince Huang's opinion, was recommending a large number of people to be commandery governors, over those that Crown Prince Huang believed should be promoted.  When Gao heard this, he stated, "It will be difficult for Cui Hao to avoid disaster. How will he be able to afford to oppose those more powerful than he, just to satisfy his own desires?"

Further, In 450, at the suggestion of his staff members Min Dan (閔湛) and Chi Biao (郗標), Cui carved the text of the histories that he was the lead editor of onto stone tablets, and erected the tablets next to the altars to Heaven outside of Pingcheng.  The tablets were said to have revealed much about Emperor Taiwu's ancestors, and the Xianbei were very angry, accusing Cui of revealing the ancestors' faults and damaging the image of the state.  Emperor Taiwu, in anger, arrested Cui.

Meanwhile, Crown Prince Huang, wanting to spare Gao, brought him into the palace, and asked Gao to blame all of the writing on Cui.  Gao, instead, ascribed the authorship of the various parts of histories as such:

 The biography of Emperor Daowu was written by Deng Yuan.
 The biographies of Emperor Mingyuan and Emperor Taiwu were written jointly by Cui and Gao, but Gao said that he actually wrote about two thirds.

Emperor Taiwu was initially going to put Gao to death as well, but then was said to be impressed by Gao's admission and spared him, also at Crown Prince Huang's urging.  He then summoned Cui, and Cui was said to be so fearful that he was not able to respond.  Emperor Taiwu then ordered Gao to draft an edict for him, ordering that Cui and Cui's staff—128 men in total—be executed, along with five family branches each.  Gao refused—stating that not even Cui should be executed.  Emperor Taiwu, in anger, was going to put Gao to death as well, but Crown Prince Huang again pleaded for Gao, and Gao was again spared, and in fact, Emperor Taiwu reduced the number of people to be executed.  However, Emperor Taiwu still ordered a great slaughter of people related to Cui.  Cui's staff members themselves were executed, although not their families.

After Cui's death, Gao continued to serve in the imperial administration, and he appeared to serve on Crown Prince Huang's staff.  Crown Prince Huang was described to be high observant, but trusting of his associates and also spending much effort on managing orchards and farms, to earn money from them.  Gao Yun tried to advise him against engaging in commercial ventures and in overly delegating authorities, but he did not listen.  Rather, in 451, he became embroiled in a conflict with the eunuch Zong Ai, whose corruption he had found out and whom he disliked immensely.  Zong, apprehensive that Crown Prince Huang's trusted associates Chouni Daosheng (仇尼道盛) and Ren Pingcheng (任平城) would accuse him of crimes, acted preemptively and accused Chouni and Ren of crimes.  In anger, Emperor Taiwu executed Chouni and Ren, and many other associates of Crown Prince Huang were entangled in the case and executed as well.  In fear, Crown Prince Huang became ill and died.  Gao became greatly saddened, and when he met with Emperor Taiwu, he could say nothing but wept.  In 452, after Emperor Taiwu began to regret the events leading to Crown Prince Huang's death, Zong became apprehensive and assassinated Emperor Taiwu, making Emperor Taiwu's youngest son Tuoba Yu the Prince of Nan'an emperor.  Later that year, however, he assassinated Tuoba Yu as well, and then was overthrown and killed by the officials Dugu Ni (獨孤尼), Yuan He, Baba Kehou (拔拔渴侯), and Buliugu Li, who made Tuoba Huang's son Tuoba Jun emperor (as Emperor Wencheng).  It was said that Gao was involved in their plot as well, but unlike the others, his role was hidden and he went unrewarded, and he did not reveal his role during his lifetime, either.

During Emperor Wencheng's regency
During Emperor Wencheng's reign, Gao Yun appeared to gradually gain power, and one characteristic that Emperor Wencheng stated that he appreciated Gao for was that he often counseled Emperor Wencheng—sometimes harshly—in private, and Emperor Wencheng said that by counseling in private, he avoided embarrassing the emperor while giving the emperor good advice.  In 458, after successfully persuading Emperor Wencheng to stop palace construction projects that Emperor Wencheng's attendant Guo Shanming (郭善明) had encouraged the emperor to carry out, Gao was promoted to the high-level position of Zhongshuling (中書令), and after Buliugu Li alerted Emperor Wencheng to the fact that Gao's household was poor (because at the time, the Northern Wei officials were not given salaries, and Gao, unlike most other Northern Wei officials, was not corrupt), gave Gao a large stipend.  Further, honoring Gao's position as a senior official, Emperor Wencheng referred to him as "Lord Ling" (令公, where Ling was shortened from Zhongshuling) rather than by name.

During Emperor Xianwen's regency
After Emperor Wencheng's death in 465, his son Emperor Xianwen became emperor, but the power was controlled by the dictatorial official Yifu Hun, who killed a large number of other officials.  In 466, Emperor Wencheng's wife Empress Dowager Feng staged a coup and overthrew Yifu, taking over herself as regent.  She engaged Gao Yun, along with Gao Lü (高閭) and Jia Xiu (賈秀) to be part of her decision-making circle.  Later that year, based on the proposal of Gao Yun and Li Xin (李訢), schools began to be set up at the commandery level to promote learning.

Emperor Xianwen assumed full imperial powers in 467, at the age of 13.  Gao continued to be in an honored position, and in 471, when Emperor Xianwen considered yielding the throne to his uncle Tuoba Zitui (拓拔子推) the Prince of Jingzhao, Gao was one of the officials whose opinions he consulted, and contrary to the other officials, who used harsh words in opposing the idea and instead proposing the idea of Emperor Xianwen yielding the throne to his son and crown prince Tuoba Hong, Gao spoke in more philosophical terms:

I dare not speak more, but I bless Your Imperial Majesty in this way: consider the important responsibilities that the ancestors gave you, and also consider the precedence of the Duke of Zhou assisting the young King Cheng of Zhou.

Emperor Xianwen took this to be a suggestion to pass the throne to his son as well, and accepted it.  The four-year-old Crown Prince Hong became emperor (as Emperor Xiaowen), although Emperor Xianwen continued to be control of the government as Taishang Huang (retired emperor).

During Emperor Xiaowen's regency
After Emperor Xiaowen took the throne, Gao Yun resumed the work on Northern Wei's history that Cui Hao had started, although he did not expend his full effort on the matter.  He later recommended Gao Lü to succeed him in the matter.  Meanwhile, for his contributions, he was created the Duke of Xianyang and made the governor of Huai Province (懷州, modern northeastern Shanxi and northwestern Hebei).  He requested to be retired in 478, but briefly he was recalled back to the capital Pingcheng, where he was given the special privilege of being allowed to ride a wagon into the palace and not having to bow to the emperor due to his old age.  As of 479, he was said to be still of clear mind and was involved in a major reorganization of the laws.  Because Emperor Xiaowen felt that Gao was poor materially and had little entertainment, he sent the imperial musicians to Gao's house every five days to entertain him, and supplied Gao with food and clothing.  Whenever Gao would meet with the emperor, the emperor also prepared a cane and a small table to help him.  Gao was said to have been healthy throughout his life, and in 487, after a very brief illness, he died.  It was said that the imperial awards given at his death were unprecedented.

In popular culture
 Portrayed by Meng Fei in the 2016 Chinese TV series The Princess Weiyoung.

References

390 births
487 deaths
Northern Wei Buddhists
Northern Wei historians
Northern Wei politicians
5th-century Chinese historians